Tom Shannon (born June 23, 1947), is an American artist and inventor.

Personal life and education 
Shannon was born in Kenosha, Wisconsin to parents John Kingsley Shannon, a Marine pilot and inventor, and Audrey Elizabeth Shannon. He has two brothers, John and James. Shannon attended the University of Wisconsin-Milwaukee. He received his MFA in 1971 from the School of the Art Institute of Chicago. On September 26, 1990 Shannon married Catherine Matisse Monnier, a great granddaughter of Henri Matisse and granddaughter of Marcel Duchamp. Shannon and his family live in New York City.

Career 
Shannon's work incorporates scientific themes. Shannon built Squat, an interactive robotic sculpture at his father's battery manufacturing plant in the summer of 1966. Squat won the Pauline Palmer Prize at the Chicago Art Institute that year in a show juried by James Speyer and Walter Hopps.

Squat, made at 19 years old, was included in the landmark exhibition The Machine as Seen at the End of the Mechanical Age at the Museum of Modern Art in New York in 1969. It is considered a seminal work in robotic art. In 2019, "Squat" was restored under the direction of the artist by a team led by Robert Sieger, at Guardian Fine Art, Milwaukee, WI.  Restored, "Squat" was a key work of art in a June-August 2019 exhibition of international sculpture, curated by Laura Sims Peck, at The Warehouse, Milwaukee, WI.  The exhibition included work by twenty-one artists from twelve countries and three continents.  During the run of the exhibition, Shannon presented an overview of his work which was videoed, and is the core of a new documentary film being made on Shannon's work and career.     

In 1981, the first of Shannon's large magnetically levitated sculptures, the seven-meter long Compass of Love, was exhibited in New York, then purchased by the Musee d'Art Moderne de la Ville de Paris.
The system of permanent magnets employed was designed by Shannon.

In 1983, Shannon patented and produced an edition of 20 World Clocks with the participation of Fuller and Sadao's cartography. An example is in the collection of the Buckminster Fuller Institute and the Smithsonian American History Museum.

Pontus Hulten, through the French Ministry of Culture, commissioned Shannon to make a major work for La Villette.  Shannon designed a 17-meter diameter spherical array of computer-controlled RGB LED nodes equidistantly spaced like atoms in a crystal, called The Crystal Ball.
.
In 1991, the Moderna Museet in Stockholm purchased Shannon's first room-sized magnetic array, Compass Moon Atom Room.

In 2000, Shannon commissioned Aerovironment to perform a feasibility study for Air Genie Video Airship.  A US Patent was granted 2003. Shannon was commissioned by the Grande Palais in Paris to make a movie of his Airlands project (aka Outlands) for a major millennial show covering ten thousand years of Visions of the Future.

His sculptures have since been included in international exhibitions such as the Centre Pompidou, the Stedelijk Museum, Moderna Museet, the Venice Biennale, the Sao Paulo Biennial, the Biennale de Lyon, the Musee d'Art Moderne de la Ville de Paris, Art Tower Mito and the Whitney Museum. He was a featured artist at the 2003 TED Conference where he presented Air Genie, a spherical helium airship whose entire surface is a LED video screen. He also presented a series of paintings made by a remote-controlled pendulum in another TED talk in 2009.

Sculpture 
Shannon's work is idea driven. His subject matter is that of existential conditions, i.e., the forces, properties, characteristics, proportions, the web of sensations and knowledge of which we are a part. For example, Ray (1986) is a sculpture of the spheres of the Sun and Earth in proportion, and the cone of energy, gravity, electromagnetic, luminous, that connects the two.

Shannon makes magnetically levitated sculpture. The sculptures are suspended using permanent magnets. His series of suspended arrays includes room-filling three-dimensional crystalline arrangements of magnetic spheres each of which orient to Earth's magnetic field like a compass.

His recent work includes large outdoor sculptures which behave as weightless objects. The sculpture's internal mechanisms consisted of axles, ball-bearings, universal joints, ball & sockets, fulcrums and massive counterweights, give them the ability to spin, tilt, rise/fall and glide horizontally and eventually return to equilibrium.

Shannon designed the TED Prize, the Buckminster Fuller prize and the Trophee Jules Verne installed at the Musee de la Marine in Paris.

In November 2019, the Science Museum Oklahoma, Oklahoma City, OK opened a year-long exhibition of new and older work by Shannon entitled "Tom Shannon: Universe in the Mind | Mind in the Universe".  In the spring of 2020, 30-foot sculpture of Platonic solids will be installed at the entrance of the museum.

Paintings 
Throughout his career Shannon has used several techniques for making paintings. At first he used traditional brush and ink (or watercolor or oil) to create paintings the subjects of which were typically projects he was working on or projects in a setting, such as a sculpture in a landscape.

Shannon then developed "Evaporations," a technique where aqueous paint was poured on a sheet of paper, and over time – a few days or weeks – the water would evaporate, leaving the pigment in dry "lakes" of color.  An important concept in this painting technique is that the pigment is held "in suspension", a color particle, as it were, "floating" in a fluid.  For Shannon, this was microscopic levitation, with a visual record of the pigment's "descent" onto a paper "ground".  It was also for him a way to co-author a painting with nature, a lesson learned from John Cage.

Another co-authoring with nature is Shannon's Trajectory series, where he tossed rubber balls wet with paint on inclined canvases, capturing the natural parabolic curve of the ball's path in gravity.

The Paint Pendulum paintings are made using a radio-controlled six color pendulum paint dispenser of the artist's invention. The pendulum paint dispenser, controlled by the artist, released paint in discrete drops, like a very large inkjet printer, or smooth flowing streams of color.

Recently in mid-2015, Shannon experimented with another painting format, which he calls Aerial Painting, where viewers can look at two-dimensional pattern on a canvas, which optically becomes a three-dimensional image, this without red and green glasses or other mechanical aids.  "Looking 'through' a painting is something you do naturally," said Shannon.  "It's the same as gazing at a distant horizon. Your brain re-orders space on the canvas, creating a natural 3D space, where objects hover in front and behind the canvas."  An example of this technique is the painting "Mind Expansion."  For Shannon this is another form of levitation, one of the recurring themes of his work.

Patents 

Shannon holds patents for:
 first tactile telephone –  – Filed January 3, 1972
 a color television projector (w/ Walter De Maria, Maris Ambats) –  – Filed October 20, 1972
 a synchronous world clock  – Filed May 17, 1984 featuring a Fuller-Sadao map face, in the collection of the Smithsonian Institution
 double-reversible garments (w/ Caty Shannon)
 a Video Airship (Air Genie)[03].  – Filed May 29, 2002
 patents pending for Graphene Floating Spheres and Magnetic Linking System

Air Genie Video Airship 

The Video Airship is an ongoing project which weaves together several themes in Shannon's work. In the late 60's Shannon proposed spherical televisions linked to orbiting camera satellites. Buckminster Fuller had earlier proposed a 200-ft sphere covered with lights to display Earth to the United Nations. Shannon designed a LED-covered spherical blimp with cameras that could land at school campuses and other public locations to deliver education and at night host rave dances. Aerovironment, Inc., the engineering firm founded by aeronautics legend Paul MacCready, found the design feasible; it can be aerodynamically controlled and can present clear computer video in daylight.

References

External links 
 

1947 births
American artists
20th-century American inventors
21st-century American inventors
Living people
University of Wisconsin–Milwaukee alumni